Vardar Macedonia, the area that now makes up North Macedonia, was part of the Ottoman Empire for over five hundred years, from the late 14th century to the Treaty of Bucharest (1913). Before its conquest, today's area was divided between various Serbian feudal principalities. Later today Vardar Macedonia became part of the Ottoman province or Eyalet of Rumelia. The name Rumelia (Turkish: Rumeli) means "Land of the Romans" in Turkish, referring to the lands conquered by the Ottoman Turks from the Byzantine Empire.

History

Conquests

In the Battle of Maritsa of 1371, the King of Lordship of Prilep Vukašin Mrnjavčević and his brother Jovan Uglješa led 70,000 men against the Ottomans. Despite having smaller numbers, the Ottomans managed to kill Vukašin and his brother and win the Battle of Maritsa.

After the battle, most of Serbia broke into smaller principalities. One of those principalities is known as the Kingdom of Prilep, led by Vukašin's son Marko. Like most regional rulers in the Macedonian region, Marko accepted vassalage under Sultan Murad I to preserve his position.

The Battle of Kosovo of 1389 sealed the fate of the region of Macedonia for the next 500 years. While both armies lost leaders and large numbers of soldiers, the Ottomans could easily assemble another army just as large while the locals could not.

Marko died alongside Konstantin Dragaš at the Battle of Rovine in 1395 and the territory of his realm became the Sanjak of Ohrid.

All of Vardar Macedonia was under Ottoman control by the early of the 15th century, with Skopje falling under Turkish rule on January 19, 1392.
Aside from conflict with Skanderbeg's forces, in which areas of western part of the region of Macedonia became a battleground of Ottoman–Albanian war for more than 20 years (1444–1467), the Ottoman Empire ultimately succeeded in taking the region, incorporating it into Rumelia Eyalet.

Rumelia Eyalet

From its foundation, the province of Rumelia encompassed the entirety of the Ottoman Empire's European possessions. The first capital of Rumelia was probably Edirne (Adrianople), which was also, until the Fall of Constantinople in 1453, the Ottomans' capital city. In the 18th century, Monastir (present day Bitola) emerged as an alternate residence of the governor, and in 1836, it officially became the capital of the eyalet. At about the same time, the Tanzimat reforms, aimed at modernizing the Empire, split off the new eyalets of Üsküb, Yanya and Selanik and reduced the Rumelia Eyalet to a few provinces around Monastir. The rump eyalet survived until 1867, when, as part of the transition to the more uniform vilayet system, it became part of the Salonica Vilayet.

The reduced Rumelia Eyalet, centred at Manastir, encompassed also the sanjaks of Iskenderiyye (Scutari), Ohri (Ohrid) and Kesrye (Kastoria). In 1855, according to the French traveller A. Viquesnel, it comprised the sanjaks of Iskenderiyye, with 7 kazas or sub-provinces, Ohri with 8 kazas, Kesrye with 8 kazas and the pasha-sanjak of Manastir with 11 kazas.

Vilayets

After administrative reform in 1860s, the Ottoman Empire was divided into vilayets which were subdivided into sanjaks.

Kosovo Vilayet
The northern part of the Macedonian region was included in the Kosovo Vilayet. Sanjaks located in this vilayet that contained territory now within the Republic of North Macedonia were:
Sanjak of Üsküp, which included the nahiye of Üsküp (Skopje), Kumanova (Kumanovo), İştip (Štip), Kratova (Kratovo), and Koçana (Kočani).
Sanjak of Prizren, which included the nahiye of Kalkandelen (Tetovo).

Monastir Vilayet
The southwestern part of the region was located in the Monastir vilayet. Sanjaks located in this vilayet that contained territory now within the Republic of North Macedonia were:
Sanjak of Monastir, which included Monastir/Manastır (Bitola), Ohri (Ohrid), Resne (Resen), and Pirlepe (Prilep)
Sanjak of Dibra, which included Debar and Kiçevo (Kičevo)

Salonika Vilayet
The southeastern part of the region was located in the Salonika vilayet. Sanjaks located in this vilayet that contained territory now within the Republic of North Macedonia were:
Sanjak of Selanik, which included the following kazas: Tikveş (Kavadarci), Usturumca (Strumica), Köprülü (Veles), Doyran (Dojran), and Gevgili (Gevgelija)
According to the Ottoman General Census of 1881/82-1893 the population of the region's Kazas are as follows:
 Doyran - 19,423 Muslims; 1,591 Greeks; 5,605 Bulgarians; 551 Others
 Usturumca - 15,760 Muslims; 13,726 Greeks, 2,974 Bulgarians; 564 Others
 Köprülü - 18,093 Muslims; 420 Greeks; 32,843 Bulgarians
 Tikveş - 19,909 Muslims; 260 Greeks; 21,319 Bulgarians; 32 Others
 Gevgili - 17,063 Muslims; 14,558 Greeks; 5,784 Bulgarians; 1402 Others

Balkan Wars

The Balkan Wars consisted of two wars that occurred in 1912 and 1913. The first began on 8 October 1912 when the nations of the Balkan League, who had large parts of their ethnic populations under Ottoman rule, attacked the Ottoman Empire. It lasted seven months with the Balkan League nations coming up victorious, ending 500 years of Ottoman rule in the Balkans.

Vardar Macedonian cities under Ottoman rule

During the Ottoman rule of the Balkans, cities experienced many changes with regards to the demographic makeup of their population and the look of their cityscapes. With laws that prohibited Christian buildings from being higher than Islamic ones, the skylines of cities like Üsküp (Skopje) and Manastır (Bitola) were dominated by minarets.

Ottoman traveller Evliya Çelebi visited the city of Manastır in 1661. He wrote that of the seven mosques in the city at the time, six were built in the 16th century. Most of the mosques constructed on the territory of today's Republic of North Macedonia were square in shape with a three-domed portico and a minaret on the building's right side.

See also

 History of North Macedonia
 History of the Balkans
 Old Bazaar, Skopje
 Ottoman era in the history of Bulgaria

References

States and territories disestablished in 1912

sv:Osmanska Makedonien